Harald Selås (17 August 1908 – 24 September 1986) was a Norwegian politician for the Labour Party.  He was born in Holt.

He was elected to the Norwegian Parliament from Telemark in 1945, and was re-elected on five occasions. He had previously been a deputy representative from 1958–1961.

Selås was a member of Tinn municipality council in the period 1937–1940.

References

Labour Party (Norway) politicians
Members of the Storting
1908 births
1986 deaths
20th-century Norwegian politicians